Les Hamilton (born 7 August 1954) is a Canadian boxer. He competed in the men's bantamweight event at the 1972 Summer Olympics. In the first round he lost to Stefan Förster of East Germany.

References

1954 births
Living people
Canadian male boxers
Olympic boxers of Canada
Boxers at the 1972 Summer Olympics
Sportspeople from Vancouver
Bantamweight boxers